Philip J. Purcell (born 1943) is an American businessman. Purcell is a former chairman and CEO of Morgan Stanley, where he worked in the late 1990s and 2000s. He was previously chairman and CEO of Dean Witter, Discover and managed the firm under its ownership by Sears, Roebuck & Co. He subsequently became head of Continental Investors, a private equity firm that invests in Internet-enabled financial services and consumer companies.

Early life and education
Phil Purcell was born and raised in Salt Lake City, Utah, where he graduated from Judge Memorial, a Catholic parochial high school. During the school year, he worked selling magazine subscriptions and pressing clothes at a drycleaner; during summers he worked road construction and at the national parks in southern Utah. He was a center on the basketball team and starting tackle on the state championship football team.

Purcell won a scholarship to the College of the Holy Cross in Worcester, Massachusetts, then transferred to Notre Dame in South Bend, Indiana after his freshman year. He won fellowships to the University of Chicago's Booth School of Business, then to the London School of Economics, paying his own way through graduate school with the fellowships and his own earnings and savings. In October 2006, Purcell contributed $12.5 million for the renovation of Notre Dame basketball arena, which was renamed "Purcell Pavilion" in his honor.

Career
Purcell has been a significant figure in the financial services industry for over 30 years. He was the main architect of Dean Witter's acquisition of Morgan Stanley in 1997, and was Chairman and CEO of the merged firm (known as Morgan Stanley) from 1997-2005.  During that period, the market cap of Morgan Stanley increased from $23 billion to $64 billion. He was previously chairman and CEO of Dean Witter, Discover & Co, from 1986 to 1997. After leaving Morgan Stanley, Purcell formed Continental Investors LLC, a private equity firm. Purcell has also been on the executive board and as vice-chairman of the New York Stock Exchange.  He was one of the founding members of the Financial Services Forum and was chairman during its first three years.

McKinsey, Sears, and Dean Witter
Purcell began his business career in 1967 at McKinsey & Co., an international management consulting firm, traveling and working with clients throughout the United States, Europe, and Asia. When he left McKinsey to join Sears in 1978, he was Managing Director of the Chicago office—the youngest head of a major office in the firm's history.

At Sears, Purcell became Senior Vice President for Corporate Administration and Planning, reporting directly to the CEO. In addition to long-range planning, his duties included exploring acquisitions and divestitures for the company. He played a leading role in Sears's acquisition of Dean Witter Reynolds on December 31, 1981, and became President in 1982 and Chairman and CEO in 1986. In 1993, Purcell led the spin-off from Sears and initial public offering of Dean Witter Discover. Shareholders buying the IPO made 20% per year, or 9 times their original investment by March 2005.

At Dean Witter, Purcell saw the potential of the asset management business well ahead of other firms. The approximately $11 billion in money and mutual fund assets at Dean Witter in 1982 grew to more than $100 billion by 1997 and to about $400 billion by 2004.  He started the Discover Card from scratch in 1986; by 2006 it had grown to more than 50 million accounts and $1.5 billion in pre-tax income.

Morgan Stanley
Purcell's record of building value for shareholders continued following the acquisition of Morgan Stanley by Dean Witter.  During the time Purcell headed Morgan Stanley, the firm outperformed market indices by a wide margin. An investment in Morgan Stanley after the merger in 1997 returned three times the original investment by March 4, 2005—a return of 16% a year compared to 5% for the S&P 500.

Morgan Stanley also achieved significant gains in the league table rankings throughout the eight years Phil Purcell was CEO. Morgan Stanley ended 2004 with the best competitive rankings in the history of the firm: #1 in global equity trading, #1 in global equity underwriting in 2004 for first time since 1982, #1 Global IPO market share in 2004, #2 in global debt underwriting in 2004 (with steady gains since late '90s), #2 in completed global M&A in 2004.

Purcell was at the helm of Morgan Stanley on September 11, 2001, when the terrorist hijacked planes hit the twin towers of the World Trade Center. More than 3,500 Morgan Stanley employees worked in the World Trade Center.  Based on the firm's experience in the earlier 1993 WTC bombing, contingency plans were in place long before 9/11.  As a result, there was a rapid evacuation and organized follow-up on 9/11 that helped mitigate the terrible tragedy.  Morgan Stanley employees at the WTC helped save lives of both Morgan Stanley employees and many others.

Purcell resigned as CEO of Morgan Stanley in June 2005 when a highly public campaign against him by former Morgan Stanley partners (the Group of Eight) threatened to disrupt and damage the firm and challenged his refusal to aggressively increase leverage, increase risk, enter the sub-prime mortgage business and make expensive acquisitions, the same actions related to the financial crisis of 2007–2008. The events that led to his resignation are covered in detail in a 2007 book by Patricia Beard, Blue Blood and Mutiny: The Fight for the Soul of Morgan Stanley.

One former business associate, Jim Cramer, wrote: "It wasn't just bad management that brought down the Morgan Stanley chief. It was also the fact that no one could stand him."

References

1943 births
Businesspeople from Salt Lake City
Purcell, Philip J.
Alumni of the London School of Economics
University of Notre Dame alumni
Private equity and venture capital investors
American Airlines people
McKinsey & Company people
Living people
Morgan Stanley employees
University of Notre Dame Trustees